Corque or Qhurqhi (Aymara) is a small town in Bolivia. In 2009 it had an estimated population of 1017.

References

Populated places in Oruro Department